Vernon Herbert Reed  (7 May 1871 – 26 May 1963) was a Liberal Party and from 1912 a Reform Party member of parliament in New Zealand. He was later a member of the Legislative Council.

Early life
Reed was the youngest son of George McCullagh Reed, a newspaper proprietor, and Jessie Chalmers Reed (née Ranken). He was born in Auckland, where his father had moved to in circa 1870 after several years in Queensland, Australia. An elder brother was John Reed.

Reed received his education at Victoria College, Jersey, Dulwich College, London, and the University of Sydney, New South Wales. He was in England from 1878 to 1887. In 1889, he joined the Daily Telegraph and in 1891 moved to The Sydney Morning Herald where he also stayed for two years. He moved to Kawakawa in the Bay of Islands at the end of 1893 or 1895 (sources differ) and commenced legal studies. He took over his brother's legal practice upon his brother's move to Auckland in 1896. He was admitted as a solicitor in 1899, and five years later, he was admitted as a barrister. Reed was clerk and treasurer to the Bay of Islands County.

Reed played cricket as a batter and bowler, representing both Dulwich College in 1886 and the Bay of Islands in 1897. He also played rugby union as a forward and represented Auckland Province in 1889, Victoria in 1890, New South Wales Colony in 1891 and 1892 and the Hawke's Bay Province in 1895. While in the Hawke's Bay, Reed captained the Waipawa Branch Union.

Political career

Reed won the Bay of Islands electorate in the 1908 general election as a candidate of the Liberal Party. The  resulted in significant losses for the Liberal Party and Joseph Ward's government survived a no-confidence motion on the casting vote of the speaker only. Ward chose to resign, though, and made way for a new liberal Prime Minister, Thomas Mackenzie. Reed expected to be part of the new cabinet and the media discussed that he might be appointed Attorney-General due to his legal background. Reed was invited to cabinet, but he did not join because the majority of the cabinet did not support his views of freehold. When the Mackenzie government faced a no-confidence vote in July 1912, Reed voted with the opposition, thus effectively joining the Reform Party.

George Wilkinson had been the Reform candidate in the Bay of Islands electorate in 1911, he was keen to represent Reform in that electorate in 1914, and he had the backing of the local electorate committee. Reed also wanted to run for Reform, and as he had the backing of the party head office, he was declared the official Reform candidate. Reed narrowly won the election against Te Rangi Hīroa of the Liberal Party, with Wilkinson coming third. Bill Veitch, at the time a United Labour Party MP in Wanganui, claimed that Wilkinson had been under immense pressure from the Reform Party not to contest the Bay of Islands election, and that William Massey had promised him a seat in the Legislative Council in return, an allegation later picked up by other media outlets but also implicating Reed in the affair.

This complaint was elevated to a formal election petition in April 1915 by Kawakawa resident Edward Evans, who engaged a King's Counsel, John Findlay, and a solicitor, Bill Endean, as his counsel. Reed used his brother, also a King's Counsel, as his counsel. The primary complaint was that Reed had, through an intermediary, tried to convince Wilkinson to retire by promising him a seat on the Legislative Council, and to reimburse him for his election campaign expenses. On 8 May 1915, the petition was upheld Justice Chapman and Justice Hosking, the election declared void, and Reed barred from standing in another election for one year. Since 1913, there have been over 100 by-elections held in New Zealand, and this was one of only five cases where a general election was declared void by the courts.

The resulting by-election was won by William Stewart in June . Reed won the electorate again in  after Stewart's resignation, and was defeated in 1922.

He was later appointed a member of the Legislative Council, from 1924 to 1931. In 1932, he hosted the Governor-General, The Viscount Bledisloe, and showed him the run-down and forgotten Busby house where the Treaty of Waitangi had been signed in 1840. The Viscount Bledisloe purchased the estate and gifted it to the nation; the Treaty House has since been registered by the New Zealand Historic Places Trust as a Category I historic place with registration number 6. Reed later wrote a book about the Bledisloe gift.

In 1926 Reed was appointed as one of three members of a Royal Commission (the 'Sim Commission') set up to investigate Māori land confiscations during the nineteenth century.

In 1935, he was awarded the King George V Silver Jubilee Medal. Reed joined the National Party and was one of the Auckland agitators against Adam Hamilton and for Charles Wilkinson.

Marriage

On 28 April 1909, Reed married Eila Mabel Williams at St Paul's Church in Auckland. His wife was from the family of missionaries who came to New Zealand from the 1820s on behalf of the Church Missionary Society. Her grandfather was Henry Williams, and her father was the runholder Thomas Coldham Williams (1825–1912). The portrait painter William Beetham was her maternal grandfather. The wedding ceremony was conducted by her father's cousin, Leonard Williams, who was Bishop of Waiapu. Her second cousin, archbishop Herbert Williams, assisted his father with the service.

Her younger sister Enid "Githa" Williams had married Royal Navy officer James Fergusson in 1901 in England; he was later to become Deputy Chief of the Naval Staff. Her elder sister Maude Burge née Williams was a New Zealand painter who lived in Saint-Tropez and was the painting companion of Frances Hodgkins Her husband's eldest brother, Sir Charles Fergusson, 7th Baronet, was the 3rd Governor-General of New Zealand (1924–1930).

Vernon and Eila Reed had three children:
"Thomas" Walton Reed (6 December 1910 – 12 November 2006), born in Wellington
"Nigel" Vernon Reed (31 October 1913 – 20 September 1997), born in Wellington
"Elfie" Clare Temple Reed (20 November 1917 – 13 March 1991), born in Wellington; married name was Elliott

Bibliography

Notes

References

1871 births
1963 deaths
Members of the New Zealand Legislative Council
Reform Party (New Zealand) MPs
New Zealand Liberal Party MPs
Reform Party (New Zealand) MLCs
Unsuccessful candidates in the 1922 New Zealand general election
Members of the New Zealand House of Representatives
New Zealand MPs for North Island electorates
People educated at Victoria College, Jersey
People educated at Dulwich College
University of Sydney alumni
New Zealand cricketers
New Zealand rugby union players
Auckland rugby union players
New South Wales Waratahs players
Hawke's Bay rugby union players